Hello Ross is an American late-night talk show hosted by Ross Mathews. The show debuted on September 6, 2013, on E!. The show was executive-produced by Chelsea Handler, Ross Mathews, Tom Brunelle, and Ray Giuliani. The show was taped in front of a live audience. The show's premise was around popular culture and it included sections on celebrity topic discussion, audience participation, a pre-taped segment, and main guest interview.

On August 12, 2014, E! cancelled Hello Ross after two seasons.

Episodes

Season 1

Season 2
On November 25, 2013, Jeff Olde, VP of Programming and Development for E!, announced that Hello Ross had been renewed for a second season, to air in early 2014. The first episode of Season 2 was aired on Friday, February 21, 2014. The last episode of the second season aired on May 16, 2014.

References

External links
 

2013 American television series debuts
2014 American television series endings
2010s American late-night television series
2010s American variety television series
English-language television shows
E! original programming